Milan Pavkov (born 9 February 1994) is a Serbian professional footballer who plays as a striker for Saudi club Al-Fayha in Saudi Professional League.

Club career

ČSK Čelarevo
After episodes with FK Novi Sad and FK Mladost Bački Petrovac, Pavkov joined ČSK Čelarevo for the 2013–14 season. In the first season playing for new club, Pavkov made 27 appearances and scored 8 goals. After the 2014–15 season, in which Pavkov finished as the best goalscorer of the Serbian League Vojvodina with 18 goals in 27 matches, ČSK Čelarevo was promoted in the First League.

Vojvodina
After solid games with ČSK Čelarevo, Pavkov went on trial with Vojvodina in the summer of 2015, and later signed a contract. He made his Serbian SuperLiga debut in a match against Mladost Lučani, played on 9 August 2015. On 2 June 2016, Pavkov and Vojvodina mutually terminated their contract.

Radnički Niš
On 4 July 2016, Pavkov signed a three-year contract with Serbian SuperLiga side Radnički Niš. Pavkov scored 2 goals against Voždovac on 10 September 2016, being nominated for the best player of the 8th SuperLiga fixture. He also scored 3 more goals until the end of 2016, in matches against Partizan, Rad and Red Star Belgrade.

Red Star Belgrade
At the beginning of 2017, Pavkov transferred to Red Star Belgrade on a -year deal for a €300,000 fee in two installments. He made his debut replacing Damien Le Tallec in the 85th minute of the match against Novi Pazar on 18 February 2017. He also scored one goal for reserves in home defeat against Kolubara. After he missed the rest of season because of injury, Pavkov returned in squad for the next season. Pavkov made his first appearance, of the new season, in the first leg of the first qualifying round for 2017–18 UEFA Europa League, replacing Richmond Boakye in the last minutes of the match against Floriana.

On 27 July 2017, Pavkov moved back to Radnički Niš on a one-year loan deal. On 13 May 2018, Pavkov was sent off during the away match against Spartak Subotica, which was the first red card in his professional career. During the 2017–18 Serbian SuperLiga campaign, Pavkov scored 23 goals on 33 played matches, making himself second scorer of the season, behind Aleksandar Pešić.

Returning to Red Star in 2018, Pavkov passed the whole summer pre-season with the club under coach Vladan Milojević. After Aleksandar Pešić left the club, Pavkov was named into the 20-man squad for the first leg of the first qualifying round for 2018–19 UEFA Champions League campaign, against Spartaks Jūrmala. He joined that match as a substitute for injured Nikola Stojiljković in 18th minute of the game. On 12 August 2018, Pavkov made his first start for Red Star, when he scored a twice in 3–0 victory over Spartak Subotica. On 6 November, he scored both goals in a 2–0 win against Liverpool in the Champions League group stage. On 12 December 2018, Pavkov signed an extension of his contract with Red Star to December 2022.

On 13 August 2021 Pavkov extended his contract with Red Star to summer of 2024.

International career
Pavkov was called up to the Serbian national team for the first time in March 2019 for games against Germany and Portugal, replacing Aleksandar Prijović who had to withdraw from the squad due to injury. He made his debut on 20 March 2019 as a substitute against Germany, replacing Luka Jović. He received a straight red card in the 90th minute of the game for a challenge on Leroy Sané.

Career statistics

Club

Honours
ČSK Čelarevo
Serbian League Vojvodina: 2014–15

Red Star Belgrade
Serbian SuperLiga (4): 2018–19, 2019–20, 2020–21, 2021–22
Serbian Cup (2): 2020–21, 2021–22

References

External links
 Milan Pavkov stats at utakmica.rs 
 
 
 
 
 

1994 births
Living people
Footballers from Novi Sad
Association football forwards
Serbian footballers
Serbian expatriate footballers
Serbia international footballers
FK Vojvodina players
RFK Novi Sad 1921 players
FK ČSK Čelarevo players
FK Radnički Niš players
Red Star Belgrade footballers
Al-Fayha FC players
Serbian SuperLiga players
Saudi Professional League players
Serbian expatriate sportspeople in Saudi Arabia
Expatriate footballers in Saudi Arabia